is a leg amputee athlete from Japan competing mainly in category T42 sprint and long jump events. He won silver medals in the long jump at the 2008 and 2016 Paralympics.

Yamamoto also competed in snowboarding at the 2018 Winter Paralympics.

References

External links
  
 
 

Living people
1982 births
Sprinters with limb difference
Japanese disabled sportspeople
Japanese male sprinters
Japanese male long jumpers
Japanese male snowboarders
Paralympic athletes of Japan
Paralympic snowboarders of Japan
Paralympic silver medalists for Japan
Paralympic bronze medalists for Japan
Athletes (track and field) at the 2008 Summer Paralympics
Athletes (track and field) at the 2012 Summer Paralympics
Athletes (track and field) at the 2016 Summer Paralympics
Snowboarders at the 2018 Winter Paralympics
Medalists at the 2016 Summer Paralympics
Medalists at the 2008 Summer Paralympics
Paralympic medalists in athletics (track and field)
Athletes (track and field) at the 2020 Summer Paralympics
People from Kakegawa, Shizuoka
Sportspeople from Shizuoka Prefecture
Long jumpers with limb difference
Paralympic sprinters
Paralympic long jumpers
Medalists at the 2010 Asian Para Games